Myluahanan Senthilnathan, also spelt Mylvahanan Senthilnathan (born 9 March 1969) is a former Indian cricketer.

Senthilnathan captained the Indian under-19 cricket team in the 1980s. A right-handed batsman, he played first-class cricket for Tamil Nadu and Goa from 1988 to 1996. His highest score was 189 in Tamil Nadu's innings victory over Assam in a pre-quarter-final of the Ranji Trophy in 1992–93.

He is currently the chief coach of MRF Pace Foundation in Chennai.

References

External links
 

1969 births
Living people
Indian cricketers
Indian cricket coaches
Tamil Nadu cricketers
Goa cricketers
People from Tiruppur district
South Zone cricketers